"Ready to Go (Get Me Out of My Mind)" (commonly referred to as simply "Ready to Go") is a song by the American rock band Panic! at the Disco, released on June 7, 2011, as the second single from the group's third studio album Vices & Virtues (2011). A clip of the song was used on the band's short film, The Overture. The song received positive critical reviews on its release.

The song was used in the credits of The Smurfs. It was also on a preview of Ready Jet Go! with part of the song.

Music video
On May 2, 2011, the video was premiered on the group's Facebook page. The video shows the band re-enacting old musical films such as Grease, Mary Poppins and Singin' In The Rain. The YouTube celebrity and dancer Dominic "D-Trix" Sandoval makes a cameo as a chimney sweep. The video was directed by Shane Drake.

As of August 2022, the video has had over 38 million views on YouTube.

Track listing

Chart performance

Release history

References

External links
Official Panic at the Disco website

2011 singles
Panic! at the Disco songs
Music videos directed by Shane Drake
2011 songs
Songs written by Spencer Smith (musician)
Songs written by Brendon Urie
Fueled by Ramen singles
Song recordings produced by Butch Walker
Song recordings produced by John Feldmann